EPDA is an acronym that may refer to:
 Education Professions Development Act
 Embedded pushdown automaton
 European Parkinson's Disease Association
 European Product Design Award